The Horecava 2010 is the 52nd edition of the Horecava. It was opened by a ceremony by Gerda Verburg on January 11 and ran until January 14, 2010. Its theme was sustainability. An important moment was the launch of the campaign Sustainable Fish that aims at improving the position of sustainable fish in restaurants. The goal of the campaign is that by the end of 2010 at least 250 restaurants will hold a Marine Stewardship Council certification.

The 2010 Innovation Award was won by the leaftender, a machine for brewing fresh tea from whole tea leaves.

References

2010 in the Netherlands